Middle Wood, Offton is a  biological Site of Special Scientific Interest north-west of Offton in Suffolk.

This is a medieval coppice with standards wood on wet boulder clay, and it has very diverse ground flora, including species typical of ancient woodland. Oak is the main standard tree, and there are orchids such as common twayblade, early purple orchid and butterfly orchid.

There is access by a footpath from Offton.

References

Sites of Special Scientific Interest in Suffolk